Stephen R. "Steve" Margolis (born September 8, 1963 in New York City) is an American trainer of thoroughbred racehorses.

Biography
Steve Margolis graduated from high school and would begin working as a groom in the sport of thoroughbred horse racing at Belmont Park in Elmont, Long Island, New York for Hall of Fame trainer John Veitch. In the 1990s Margolis worked for trainers Pat Byrne and Howard Tesher and later on for Stanley Hough. In 1997 he went to Kentucky with Stanley Hough as an assistant and in 2000 became a horse trainer himself. On September 15, 2000, Margolis won his first race as a trainer at Turfway Park with a horse named Her Great Affair. In 2002, he received another horse named Request for Parole with whom he won the WEBN and John Battaglia Memorial Stakes at Turfway Park. Request For Parole also finished fifth in the 2002 Kentucky Derby. In 2003, Margolis trained Baileys Edge to a win in the Mr. Prospector Handicap at Gulfstream Park. The same year, Cajun Beat brought Margolis victory in the Kentucky Cup Sprint at Turfway Park and then the most important win of his career in the Breeders' Cup Sprint. The same horse finished fourth in the Dubai Golden Shaheen at Nad Al Sheba Racecourse in Dubai.

References

1963 births
Sportspeople from New York City
Living people
American horse trainers